Ida Ekblad (born 1980) is a Norwegian artist who works across painting, sculpture, installation and poetry.

Her work is inspired by a multitude of sources and one can recognize sub-cultural and pop-cultural influences. Art historically, Ekblad’s oeuvre is often linked to the ideas and gestures of movements such as CoBrA, Situationism, and Abstract Expressionism and is influenced by a variety of artists such as Odilon Redon, Paula Modersohn Becker, Marie Laurencin, Paul Thek, Harriet Backer, Florine Stettheimer, and Helen Frankenthaler. Her style is signified by a genre-crossing approach and incorporates, for example, the aesthetics of graffiti, manga culture, arts and crafts, old master paintings, deviant art, and meme culture. Ekblad’s practice is focused on our hyper-retinal culture which she tries to visually record and comprehend. “Whatever sense I find,” she says, “is primarily an aesthetic sense. In painting, sculpture, and via material twists and turns, I am striving to make a personal and decent pattern of what happens to come my way.” (Ida Ekblad, Artist Statement, “A mansion for all lovely forms,” 2018)

Background
Ekblad was born in Oslo, Norway, in 1980. She studied at Central Saint Martins College of Art and Design in London before earning both her BA and MA in Fine Art from The National Academy of Art, Oslo, graduating in 2007. In 2016, she founded the exhibition space and record label SCHLOSS in a former Porsche car repair workshop in Oslo.

Exhibitions
Ekblad's work has been exhibited in many institutions such as the Venice Biennale, the National Museum of Art, Architecture and Design, Oslo, Kunsthaus Hamburg, Palais de Tokyo, Paris and the BALTIC Centre for Contemporary Art in Gateshead, UK. In 2019, Ekblad had major museum shows at Museo Rufino Tamayo, Mexico City and Kunsthalle Zürich.

Solo exhibitions 
2010: Digging. Treasure. Bonniers Konsthall, Stockholm, Sweden
2010: Poem Percussion, Bergen Kunsthall, Bergen, Norway
2013: The Root cellar, De Vleeshal, Middelburg, Netherlands
2013: Ida Ekblad, National Museum of Norway - Museum of Contemporary Art, Oslo, Norway
2015: Ida Ekblad, BALTIC Centre for Contemporary Art, Gateshead, United Kingdom
2017: Ida Ekblad – Diary of a Madam, Kunsthaus Hamburg, Hamburg, Germany
2018: Leda Bourgogne | Ida Ekblad, Kunstverein Braunschweig, Braunschweig, Germany
2019: BLOOD OPTICS, Museo Tamayo, Mexico City, Mexico
2019: FRA ÅRE TIL OVN, Kunsthalle Zürich, Zurich, Switzerland

Group exhibitions 

2011: ILLUMInazioni, 54th Venice Biennale, Venice, Italy
2013: Revolution, Kunstmuseum Luzern, Luzern, Switzerland
2015: Raw and Delirious, Kunsthalle Bern, Bern, Switzerland
2015: The World is Made of Stories, Astrup Fearnley Museum, Oslo, Norway
2017: University of Disaster, Venice Biennale, National Pavilion Bosnia & Herzegovina, Palazzo Malipiero, Venice, Italy
2018: Faithless Pictures, National Museum, Oslo, Norway

Collections 
Her artwork is part of numerous public collections, among them are the Migros Museum für Gegenwartskunst, the Louisiana Museum of Modern Art, Moderna Museet, the Astrup Fearnley Museum, the Preus Museum and the Hessel Museum of Art.

Publications 

 Ida Ekblad: The Root Cellar, SBKM/Vleeshal & MER Paper Kunsthalle, 2014, 
 Ida Ekblad: Poem Percussion, Bergen Kunsthall,

References

External links 
 Galerie Max Hetzler, Ida Ekblad

1980 births
Living people
Artists from Oslo
Oslo National Academy of the Arts alumni
20th-century Norwegian painters
21st-century Norwegian painters